Trichopoda plumipes is a species of feather-legged fly in the family Tachinidae. The abdomen is black with pairs of rectangular yellow spots. It parasitizes bugs of the families Pentatomidae, Coreidae and others.  It is found in North America.

References

Further reading

External links

 

Phasiinae